Haliclystus auricula is a stalked jellyfish found in the Northern hemisphere.  It is the type species for its genus.

Name
In 2010, Natural England, The Guardian and the Oxford University Museum of Natural History ran a competition asking members of the public to provide a common name for this species.  The name "Kaleidoscope Jellyfish," submitted by Kepler Petzall, was eventually chosen. Runner-up names included Fractal flower jellyfish and Mermaid's trumpet jellyfish.

Description
H. auricula is 2-2.5 cm tall with the stalk accounting for half of the height of the organism. The remainder of the organism is shaped like a funnel, the colour of which varies across the species from grey/green to red/brown.  It has eight arms which radiate out from a central mouth.  Each arm is tipped by clusters of up to 100 tentacles and connected by a thin membrane.  Primary tentacles known as anchors are located on the membrane margin between the arms.  The kidney-shape of these appendages is a key distinguishing feature of this species.

Distribution
H. auricula is one of ten species of Haliclystus found in the Northern hemisphere. It is very sensitive to pollution.  The populations along the British coastline are in decline. Distribution includes the Shetland Isles, Orkney, western coast of England, Scotland and Ireland.

Habitat
This species lives in shallow water that has adequate circulation on marine eelgrass and other algae.  Depths they are found in range from mid-eulittoral to shallow sublittoral. H. auricula is able to move location by attaching a specialised tentacle to the substrate as an anchor, detaching its base and 'cartwheeling' into the new position.

Lifecycle
This species reproduces by sexual means.  H. auricula is most abundant in a given location in midsummer. Like all stalked jellyfish, a single H. auricula individual is believed to live for only one year. Diet consists of benthic species, primarily crustaceans.

References

External links
 Haliclystus auricula entry on the Marine Life Information Network
 Haliclystus auricula entry on WoRMS

Haliclystidae
Animals described in 1806